Bindya is a 1960 Indian Hindi-language drama film directed by Krishnan–Panju and produced by M. Saravanan. It is a remake of the Tamil film Deivapiravi, released early the same year. The film stars Balraj Sahni, Padmini and Jagdeep. It was released on 29 December 1960, and failed to replicate the success of the Tamil original.

Plot 
After the passing of their parents, Devraj lives with his much younger brother, Ramu, in a small town in India. He gets married to Bindya, who moves in along with her mom, and brother, Raju. Devraj, who works with Rai Saheb Kedarnath, gets a promotion as a Government Contractor, and they move into a bigger house. Years later, Raju and Ramu have grown up, and Bindya's mom has passed on. While Raju has taken to petty crime and bad company, Ramu is more focused on his studies and has good sober habits. Devraj would like Raju to get married to Rama, Kedarnath's daughter, but he subsequently finds out that she has fallen in love with Ramu. This news is met with anger by Raju, who swears to avenge this humiliation. Devraj's step-mother, Mrs. Ramnath, and her daughter, Nandini, move in with them - thus ending their idyllic lifestyle - with Devraj suspecting Bindya of having an affair with their cook, Chandan, and Bindya thinking that Devraj is having an affair with Nandini. Things get bad to worse, when Ramu is accused of stealing a diamond ring from Kedarnath's house, and the Police being summoned. Questions that remain unanswered are: Are Devraj and Bindya really having affairs with Nandini and Chandan respectively, and why would Ramu steal from his prospective father-in-law's house?

Cast 
 Balraj Sahni as Devraj
 Padmini as Bindya
 Jagdeep as Ramu
 Vijaya Chaudhary as Rama
 Achala Sachdev as Bindya's mother
 Lalita Pawar as Mrs. Ramnath (Devraj's stepmother)
 David as Rai Sahib Kedarnath
 Jayshree Gadkar as Nandini
 Om Prakash as Shastri
 Minoo Mumtaz as Priyadarshini
 Rajendranath as Chandan

Production 
Following the success of the Tamil film Deivapiravi (1960), producer M. Saravanan wanted to remake the film in Hindi. Deivapiravi star Sivaji Ganesan advised him against doing so, feeling it would not come well. Saravanan ignored Ganesan's advice, and remade the film in that language with the title Bindya. Krishnan–Panju, the directors of Deivapiravi, returned to direct the remake.

Soundtrack 
The soundtrack was composed by Iqbal Qureshi. The song "Main Apne Aap Se Ghabra Gaya Hoon" attained popularity.

Release and reception 
Bindya was released on 29 December 1960. The film failed to replicate the success of the Tamil original, and Saravanan later regretted ignoring Ganesan's advice. However, in a review dated 11 August 1961, The Indian Express praised the performances of Sahni, Padmini, Jagdeep, Lalitha Pawar and Om Prakash.

References

External links 
 

Indian drama films
Indian black-and-white films
Hindi remakes of Tamil films
Films directed by Krishnan–Panju
AVM Productions films
1960 films
1960 drama films
1960s Hindi-language films
Hindi-language drama films